Ghirlandaio is the surname of a family of Renaissance Italian painters:

 Domenico Ghirlandaio (1449–1494), painter of fresco cycles and Michelangelo's teacher
 Davide Ghirlandaio (1452–1525), younger brother of Domenico
 Benedetto Ghirlandaio (1458–1497), younger brother of Domenico and Davide
 Ridolfo Ghirlandaio (1483–1561), son of Domenico

See also
 Michele Tosini (1503–1577), Italian painter also known as Ghirlandaio

Italian-language surnames
15th-century Italian painters
Italian male painters
16th-century Italian painters
Families of Florence